The discography of English singer Paul Young consists of nine studio albums, two live albums, 15 compilation albums, and 36 singles. Following short stints in several groups, Young became known in the 1980s for his baritone voice.

From 1983 to 1993, all of Young's studio albums were released during a contract he had with Columbia Records, and since 1994, Young has released albums through Vision, East West and SonyBMG Records. Four of Young's albums, No Parlez (1983), The Secret of Association (1985), Between Two Fires (1986), and Other Voices (1990) feature Welsh bassist Pino Palladino.

The subsequent release by Young, The Crossing (1993), was produced by Don Was and featured a rhythm section with the late Jeff Porcaro on drums, along with Palladino, James "Hutch" Hutchinson, and Freddie Washington on bass.

Albums

Studio albums

Live albums

Compilation albums

Box sets

Singles

Promotional singles

Videos

Video albums

Music videos

Notes

References

Discographies of British artists